Richard Harned (born 1951) is an American contemporary kinetic sculptor and glass artist. Harned trained under Dale Chihuly in the 1970s at the Rhode Island School of Design (RISD) with other artists of the American Glass Movement, including Bruce Chao and Tom Kreager. In 1974, he established the Abstract Glass studio in Providence, Rhode Island. After graduating from and teaching at RISD, he also taught glass art at Arkansas State University in Jonesboro and the University of Tennessee. He joined the faculty of Ohio State University in 1982.

Artwork 
Harned’s work has evolved from small utilitarian pieces and abstract glass objects to room-sized kinetic sculptures built to explore the use of light, movement, and technology in art. His message is about the connection of ideas to the dynamism of the physical world. His sculpture combines the aesthetic beauty of glass with the drama of complex moving constructions, embellished with decorative and symbolic elements. His pieces are often presented with a humorous post-modern warning about technology’s impact on nature.

The kinematic works of the 1980s and 1990s were built with elements of welded steel, often combined with neon lighting and glass, rotating television monitors, computers, and globes. He floated neon and fluorescent light sculptures in water, combining the natural reflection of water with the glow of artificial light, and the unnatural mix of electricity and water.

Affiliations 
Harned has been an important artist of American Glass movement starting in the 1970s. He founded and directed the Glass Axis workshop, an organization to promote glass art in Columbus, Ohio. He served as president of the Glass Art Society (1987–1988), an international professional association. He has worked at the Pilchuck School in Washington, which was established by Dale Chihuly as an international school for glass artists. He has also been a visiting artist in the Netherlands, Japan, and Germany.

Chronology of major works and events 
 1982:  “Being of Light” — Fluorescent lights, plastic, wood. Kerr Lake, Virginia.
 1985: “Purple Room” — Colored glass sheets, neon, blown glass, and steel.
 1986: “Treadmill” — Ultraviolet lamps, motor, steel and mirrors. Visual Art Association, Louisville, Kentucky. . height, . wide, . depth.
 1987: “Wink-O-Matic Deluxe” (with Tom Kreager) — Steel, neon, and animation. Rochester Institute of Technology. . height, . length, . depth.
 1987: “Drum/Sphere” — motorized steel and neon, Rochester Institute of Technology. . height, . width, . depth
 1988: “Kinesthetic Refuge” — neon lights, electric motors, steel. Akron Art Museum. . height, . width, . depth.
 1988: “Cube” — neon, plastic. Columbus, Ohio.
 1989: “Red Axis” — Blown glass, painted steel wall relief sculpture.
 1989: “God’s Eye” — Neon and colored sheet glass.
 1990: “Ghosts of Japan” — light sculpture for the theatrical production, Dallas Children's Theater in Dallas.
 1990: “Night Sky—Sun in Taurus” — Steel, bowling balls, solar cells, lights. Heritage Village Sculpture on the Riverfront Arts Festival, State Department Building, Columbus, Ohio.
 1991: “Eccentric Vision” — Steel gazebo, globes, video monitors, light bulbs. Glassworks,  Renwick Gallery, Smithsonian American Art Museum, Washington, DC.
 1991: “Oracle” — Painted steel, glass, mirror, magnets, TV cameras, visual telephone, speakers. Wexner Center for the Arts, Columbus, Ohio.
 1991: “Glass Eats Light” — Steel, globes, TV Monitors, NSOGW Gallery, New Orleans, Louisiana.
 1996: “Three Phoites of Light” — University of Wisconsin–Madison.
 1998: Seto, Japan, sculpture and workshop. Aichi University, Glass Art Society.
 1998: Haystack Mountain School of Crafts, teaching appointment. Deer Isle, Maine.
 2001: “Expansions I” — Wexner Center for the Arts, Columbus, Ohio.
 2004: “ How Nature Works” (with Xan Palay) Steel globes, bowling balls.

References

External links 
 Harned’s website at The Ohio State University
 Glass Axis website
 Bruce Chao
 We are Transmitters: a visual essay and guide to Richard Harned’s eccentric vision.

1951 births
Living people
American glass artists
Arkansas State University faculty
Ohio State University faculty
Rhode Island School of Design alumni